The Mayer-Salovey-Caruso Emotional Intelligence Test (MSCEIT) is an ability-based measure of emotional intelligence. The test was constructed by academics John D. Mayer, Peter Salovey, and David R. Caruso at Yale and the University of New Hampshire in cooperation with Multi-Health Systems Inc. The test measures emotional intelligence through a series of questions and tests the participant's ability to perceive, use, understand, and regulate emotions. Using questions based on everyday scenarios, the MSCEIT measures how well people respond to social tasks, read facial expressions, and solve emotional problems. The MSCEIT is used in corporate, educational, research, and therapeutic settings.

Test structure 
MSCEIT measures four aspects of emotional intelligence:

See also 
 Emotional intelligence

References 

Psychological tests and scales
Emotional intelligence